Hendecasis pulchella is a moth of the family Crambidae described by George Hampson in 1916. It is found in Taiwan and Japan.

References

Moths described in 1916
Cybalomiinae
Moths of Japan